Project Runway All Stars (season 1) is the first season of the Project Runway spin-off series Project Runway All Stars. It features 13 designers from seasons 1–8 of the original series with a new host, new judges and a new mentor. It premiered on Lifetime on January 5, 2012.

Judges 
Model Angela Lindvall serves as the host as well as a judge. Designers Isaac Mizrahi and Georgina Chapman are the other recurring judges. Marie Claire Editor-in-Chief Joanna Coles mentors the veteran designers. Guest judges include fashion designer Diane von Fürstenberg, fictional character Miss Piggy, singer-actress Sutton Foster, model Miranda Kerr, and musician and producer Pharrell Williams. Lead makeup artist for the show is Scott Patric, and lead hairstylist is Linh Nguyen.

Designers 
Names and locales per official site:

Designer progress

 The designer won Project Runway All Stars Season 1.
 The designer won the challenge.
 The designer was in the top two, or the first announced into the top 3, but did not win. 
 The designer had one of the highest scores for that challenge, but did not win.
 The designer had one of the lowest scores for that challenge, but was not eliminated.
 The designer was in the bottom two, but was not eliminated.
 The designer lost and was out of the competition.

Models
Jessamine Kelley
Taylor Dean McCausland
Alejandra Leslie Mancia
Elaina Williams
Karli Babcock
Halie Noel
Rae Hight
Lindley Jones
Tatjana Sinkevica
Brittany Bass
Eden Viza
Kelly Dahlen
Kelly Brown

Rate The Runway Results
{| class="wikitable" style="text-align:center"
|+Designer Elimination Table
! Designer || 1 || 2 || 3 || 4 || 5 || 6 || 7 || 8 || 9 || 10 || 11 
|-
! Mondo
| style="background:turquoise;"| HIGH || style="background:white;"| IN || style="background:white;"| IN || style="background:turquoise;"| HIGH || style="background:cornflowerblue;"| WIN || style="background:pink;"| LOW || style="background:cornflowerblue;"| WIN || style="background:cornflowerblue;"| WIN || style="background:lightblue;"| HIGH || style="background:cornflowerblue;"| WIN || style="background:limegreen;"| WINNER
|-
! Austin
| IN || style="background:cornflowerblue;"| WIN || style="background:pink;"| LOW || style="background:lightblue;"| HIGH || style="background:turquoise;"| HIGH || style="background:orange;"| LOW || style="background:lightblue;"| HIGH || style="background:pink;"| LOW || style="background:cornflowerblue;"| WIN || style="background:turquoise;"| HIGH || style="background:tomato;"| OUT
|-
! Michael
| IN || style="background:turquoise;"| HIGH || style="background:cornflowerblue;"| WIN || style="background:cornflowerblue;"| WIN || style="background:orange;"| LOW || IN || style="background:turquoise;"| HIGH || style="background:lightblue;"| HIGH || style="background:orange;"| LOW || style="background:orange;"| LOW || style="background:tomato;"| OUT
|-
! Kenley
| IN || IN || style="background:lightblue;"| HIGH  || IN || IN || IN || style="background:pink;"| LOW || style="background:turquoise;"| HIGH || style="background:turquoise;"| HIGH || style="background:tomato;"| OUT || style="background:darkgray;" colspan="1"|
|-
! Jerell
| style="background:lightblue;"| HIGH || IN || style="background:white;"| IN || IN || style="background:pink;"| LOW || style="background:cornflowerblue;"| WIN || IN || style="background:orange;"| LOW || style="background:tomato;"| OUT || style="background:darkgray;" colspan="2"|
|-
! Mila
| IN || IN || style="background:orange;"| LOW || style="background:pink;"| LOW || IN || IN || style="background:orange;"| LOW || style="background:tomato;"| OUT || style="background:darkgray;" colspan="3"|
|-
! Kara
| IN || style="background:pink;"| LOW ||   IN || style="background:orange;"| LOW || IN || IN || style="background:tomato;"| OUT || style="background:darkgray;" colspan="4"|
|-
! Rami
| style="background:cornflowerblue;"| WIN || IN || style="background:turquoise;"| HIGH || IN || style="background:lightblue;"| HIGH || style="background:tomato;"| OUT || style="background:darkgray;" colspan="5"|
|-
! Anthony
| IN || style="background:lightblue;"| HIGH|| style="background:white;"| IN || IN || style="background:tomato;"| OUT || style="background:darkgray;" colspan="6"|
|-
! April
| IN || style="background:orange;"| LOW || IN || style="background:tomato;"| OUT || style="background:darkgray;" colspan="7"|
|-
! Gordana
| style="background:pink;"| LOW || IN ||style="background:tomato;"|  OUT || style="background:darkgray;" colspan="8"|
|-
! Sweet P
| style="background:orange;"| LOW || style="background:tomato;"| OUT || style="background:darkgray;" colspan="10"|
|-
! Elisa
| style="background:tomato;"| OUT' || style="background:darkgray;" colspan="11"|
|}

 Episodes 

 Episode 1: Return to the Runway Original Airdate: January 5, 2012

 Designers are to create an outfit based on a look they showed earlier in the episode. The materials are purchased from a 99 cent store.
 Guest Judge: Ken Downing
 Winner: Rami
 Eliminated Elisa

Episode 2: A Night at the OperaOriginal Airdate: January 12, 2012

 The all-star fashion aces race against time to spin out elegant ball gowns for a night at the opera.
 Guest Judges: Mark Badgley and James Mischka of Badgley Mischka 
 Winner: Austin
 Eliminated: Sweet P

Episode 3:  Patterning for PiggyOriginal Airdate: January 19, 2012

 The designers are asked to design a flamboyant cocktail dress for Miss Piggy.
 Guest Judges: Miss Piggy and Eric Daman (sitting in for   Isaac Mizrahi )
 Winner: Michael
 Eliminated: Gordana

Episode 4: Good Taste Tastes GoodOriginal Airdate: January 26, 2012

The designers were given only 6 hours, the shortest time in PR history, to design an outfit for Australian supermodel Miranda Kerr. The outfit was to be inspired by a flavor of gelato. As the winner of the last challenge, Michael had the privilege of selecting his flavor first. Note that in March 2006, Kerr was an unnamed model for Daniel Vosovic's 12-piece finale collection. In addition, she was a guest judge on the fourth season of Project Runway Australia.

 Guest Judges: Diane von Fürstenberg and Miranda Kerr
 Winner: Michael
 Eliminated: April

Episode 5: Clothes Off Your BackOriginal Airdate: February 2, 2012

The All Stars take to the streets of New York to convince total strangers to part with their clothes in the name of fashion. The muses' outfits are ripped apart and reborn in the hands of the designers.
 Guest Judge: Sean Avery
 Winner: Mondo
 Eliminated: Anthony

Episode 6: Fashion Face-OffOriginal Airdate: February 9, 2012

Each designer picked a bag; in the bag was a luggage tag with a season on it. The designers were told to create "sportwear for a weekend getaway look", and the designers with the same seasons were pitted against each other.

 Guest Judge: Cynthia Rowley
 Winner: Jerell
 Eliminated: Rami

Episode 7: Puttin' on the GlitzOriginal Airdate: February 16, 2012

The designers head to Broadway and design an outfit for an actress in the musical Godspell, who is portrayed as a rich girl.
 Guest Judges: Sutton Foster
 Winner: Mondo
 Eliminated: Kara

Episode 8: O! Say, Can You Sew?Original Airdate: February 23, 2012

The designers head to the United Nations Headquarters and were asked to design dresses that were inspired by the flags and culture of the country they chose.
 Austin - Seychelles
 Jerell - India
 Kenley - Chile
 Michael - Greece
 Mila - Papua New Guinea
 Mondo - Jamaica
 Guest Judge: Catherine Malandrino
 Winner: Mondo
 Eliminated: Mila

Episode 9: When I Get My Dress In LightsOriginal Airdate: March 1, 2012

 Designers created avant-garde outfits using lighting technology. The runway was also lit by blacklight to add an extra touch to the show. The winning design was featured in one of Pharrell Williams' productions.
 Guest Judge : Pharrell Williams
 Winner: Austin
 Eliminated: Jerell

Episode 10: Let's Get Down To BusinessOriginal Airdate: March 8, 2012

 The designers must create a look that can be manufactured and sold for a certain price point.
 Guest Judge: Nanette Lepore
 Winner: Mondo
 Eliminated: Kenley

Episode 11: Finale, Part 1Original Airdate: March 15, 2012

 The final three designers have four days to create a mini collection.
To be continued...

Episode 12: Finale, Part 2Original Airdate:'' March 22, 2012

 Guest Judge: Tommy Hilfiger and Ken Downing
 Winner: Mondo
Eliminated: Austin (Runner-up) and Michael (3rd Place)

References

External links

All Stars Season 01
2012 American television seasons
2012 in fashion
2012 in American television
Tommy Hilfiger (company)